I Have Returned was Ray Stevens' twenty-second studio album and his second for MCA Records, released in 1985. The pictures on both the front and the back of the album were taken in the Mississippi Sound near Biloxi, Mississippi according to the album credits. The cover depicts Stevens dressed as General Douglas MacArthur from World War II. "The Haircut Song" and "The Ballad of the Blue Cyclone" were released as singles from the album. "Santa Claus Is Watching You" is a re-recording of Stevens' 1960s pop single and was re-issued as a country single around the time of the album's release and was made into a popular music video.

Stevens later re-recorded "The Pirate Song" on his 1991 album #1 With a Bullet and re-recorded the song a third time in 2000 for a music video found on Funniest Video Characters.

The first track, "Thus Cacked Henrietta", is a rendition of the popular fanfare portion from Richard Strauss' "Also sprach Zarathustra", performed in chicken clucks. The rendition by Stevens lasts a little over 1 minute and was his first chicken-clucking performance since 1977's "In the Mood," released under the alias The Henhouse Five Plus Too.

Track listing

Album credits 
 Arranged and Produced by Ray  Stevens
 Engineer – Stuart Keathley
 Recorded at Ray Stevens Studio (Nashville, Tennessee).
 Mastered by Glenn Meadows at Masterfonics (Nashville, Tennessee).
 Art Direction – Ray Stevens and Slick Lawson
 Design – Simon Levy
 Photography – Slick Lawson
 Production Manager – Susan Scott
 Landing Craft: Vincent J. Fusca, III, Captain USMC, 4th PLT (REIN) CO. A, 4th ASLT AMPH BN, USMCR, Gulfport, MS.
 Special Thanks To: Pony Maples-Weapons, Faye Sloan Costumes, George Nalley-Stevens Aviation.

Musicians
 Ray Stevens – vocals, backing vocals, keyboards, synthesizers, timpani, trumpet 
 Steve Gibson – electric guitars, dobro
 Mark Casstevens – rhythm guitars, banjo
 Jack Williams – bass
 Jerry Carrigan – drums 
 Jerry Kroon – drums 
 Denis Solee – saxophones
 Roger Bissell – trombone 
 Lisa Silver – backing vocals 
 Wendy Suits – backing vocals 
 Diane Tidwell – backing vocals

Chart performance

Album

Singles

References

1985 albums
Ray Stevens albums
MCA Records albums